The Sligo Weekender is a weekly local newspaper published every Thursday in Sligo, County Sligo in Ireland. It contains news of interest to Sligo town and county along with the surrounding counties of Leitrim, Roscommon, South Donegal and North Mayo.

History
The newspaper was founded in 1983 by Brian McHugh, initially as an advertising-funded 'freesheet' with some local news. In 1996, McHugh sold the publication to Thomas Crosbie Holdings (TCH), publisher of the Irish Examiner and other titles; he remained as editor. It became a paid-for newspaper in 2002.

In December 2010, TCH sold the tabloid newspaper to Carrick-on-Shannon native Kevin Mitchell, who operated a printing company in Wexford. In 2019, it was purchased from Mitchell by Dorothy Crean. Since its purchase by Crean, it is one of the few regional newspapers in Ireland that is locally owned.

Competition and circulation
As of 2007, the newspaper's competition included the Sligo Champion and Sligo Post. According to circulation figures collated by the Audit Bureau of Circulations for late 2007, the Sligo Weekender then had a weekly circulation of approximately 7,900 copies.

Recognition
In 2004, the Sligo Weekender won a "community activity" award (for newspapers with circulations under 50,000) at the International Newspaper Marketing Awards. It also previously received an "award of excellence" at the European Newspaper Design Awards.

References

External links

1983 establishments in Ireland
Mass media in County Sligo
Newspapers published in the Republic of Ireland
Publications established in 1983
Sligo Weekender
Thomas Crosbie Holdings
Weekly newspapers published in Ireland